Joseph Hepworth (c. 1876 – 11 May 1945) was a British Conservative Party politician.

At the 1931 general election, he was elected as Member of Parliament (MP) for Bradford East, defeating the sitting Labour Party MP Fred Jowett. He was re-elected at the 1935 general election, and served in the House of Commons until his death shortly before the 1945 general election.

He served as Bradford Northern R.F.C. Chairman for four years.

References

External links 
 

1870s births
1945 deaths
Conservative Party (UK) MPs for English constituencies
UK MPs 1931–1935
UK MPs 1935–1945
Politicians from Bradford